Dmitry Trelevski (born November 14, 1983 in Bishkek) is an alpine skier from Kyrgyzstan. He competed for Kyrgyzstan at the 2010 Winter Olympics in the slalom and giant slalom. Trelevski was Kyrgyzstan's flag bearer during the 2010 Winter Olympics opening ceremony and in 2014.

References

External links
 

1983 births
Living people
Kyrgyzstani male alpine skiers
Olympic alpine skiers of Kyrgyzstan
Alpine skiers at the 2010 Winter Olympics
Alpine skiers at the 2011 Asian Winter Games
Sportspeople from Bishkek
Kyrgyzstani people of Russian descent